The 1997–98 Eliteserien season was the 41st season of ice hockey in Denmark. Ten teams participated in the league, and Herning IK won the championship.

First round

Final round

Playoffs

External links
Season on hockeyarchives.info

Dan
Eliteserien (Denmark) seasons
1997 in Danish sport
1998 in Danish sport